Choi Mi-Soon (born 30 September 1972) is a South Korean former field hockey player who competed in the 1996 Summer Olympics.

References

External links
 

1972 births
Living people
South Korean female field hockey players
Olympic field hockey players of South Korea
Field hockey players at the 1996 Summer Olympics
Olympic silver medalists for South Korea
Olympic medalists in field hockey
Asian Games medalists in field hockey
Field hockey players at the 1998 Asian Games
Asian Games gold medalists for South Korea
Medalists at the 1998 Asian Games
Medalists at the 1996 Summer Olympics
20th-century South Korean women
21st-century South Korean women